Streets of London is a text adventure published for the Commodore 64 in 1983 by the British software publisher Supersoft. Originally released for the Commodore PET as Pythonesque, the game's humour is almost entirely derived from comedy troupe Monty Python.

References

External links
 
 
 Gamebase 64 entry for Streets of London

1980s interactive fiction
1983 video games
Adventure games
Commodore 64-only games
Video games developed in the United Kingdom
Video games set in London